Zhang Jifu (born September 1964) is a Chinese politician, and the Communist Party Secretary of Datong. He entered the workforce in September 1989, and joined the Chinese Communist Party in March 1985.

Before his career in Datong, Zhang served as the Party Secretary for the district of Pinggu in Beijing from 2013 to 2015.

Biography 
Zhang was born and raised in Tianjin. 

He graduated from the College of Agronomy and Biotechnology of China Agricultural University. After university, he was assigned to the Beijing Foreign Trade Import and Export Corporation and over a period of 9 years worked his way up to the position of manager. In March 2003 he became the deputy director of the Beijing Investment Promotion Bureau, rising to director three years later. In March 2010, he was named acting district head of Pinggu, replacing Qiu Shuiping. He was promoted to Communist Party Secretary, the top political position in the district, in March 2013. 

In July 2015 he was transferred to Datong, Shanxi, and appointed the Communist Party Secretary there. In November 2016, he was named a member of the provincial party standing committee.

He was a delegate to the 19th National Congress of the Chinese Communist Party.

References 

1964 births
Living people
China Agricultural University alumni
Central Party School of the Chinese Communist Party alumni
People's Republic of China politicians from Tianjin
Chinese Communist Party politicians from Tianjin
Political office-holders in Shanxi